The men's triple jump event  at the 1997 IAAF World Indoor Championships was held on March 8–9.

Medalists

Results

Qualification
Qualification: 16.80 (Q) or at least 12 best performers (q) qualified for the final.

Final

References

Triple jump
Triple jump at the World Athletics Indoor Championships